Nodeulseom an artificial island in the River Han in Seoul, South Korea.  The uninhabited island is located to the east of the larger island of Yeouido. Hangang Bridge passes directly over the island. 

On September 28, 2019, the island was re-opened as a music-themed cultural complex following a four-year renovation project. On the island, there are various cultural facilities including an outdoor music space, bookstore, a large green open area and a two meter moon art installation called Moonlight Nodeul.

History
Indo Bridge used to span the Han River, crossing Nodeulseom, but was destroyed by the U.S. military in the Korean War to prevent the North Koreans from using it. In 1913, Hae Hae-chang, the marquis of the Japanese Empire, claimed ownership of the land of Shincho-ri and sold it to the governor-general of Joseon without the consent of the citizens. In response, the residents of Shincho-ri received a formal protest from 86 adult men, led by Lee Jang Kim Yoon-seok, and were unconditionally forcibly evicted. Accordingly, when the Hangang footbridge was opened in 1917, a part of Shincho-ri in the past becomes Jungjido between the Hangang Bridge. There was an accident on the site in the middle of the Yukhyeon River, so it was possible to ease the traffic of the road connected to the Suwonji road that supplies water to the Yongsan Station Gyeongbu Line railway.

Development
In accordance with the development plan of 1989, a tennis practice field was built on the Hangang Bridge Iseo. However, the plan to build a large-scale citizen's park was abandoned, and the land remained empty for a long time. Since then, plans to build an opera house were in progress, but it was canceled and turned into a weekend farm. After discussions, the construction of a small performing arts center began in October 2017, and Nodeul Island was reborn as a complex cultural space opening on September 28, 2019.

See also

 List of artificial islands
 List of islands
 Desert island

References

Uninhabited islands of South Korea
River islands of South Korea
Artificial islands of South Korea
Islands of Seoul